Freeport Hebrew Congregation was the only synagogue in The Bahamas. The synagogue is named after Luis de Torres, identified by Meyer Kayserling's book Christopher Columbus and the participation of the Jews in the Spanish and Portuguese discoveries (1894) as a Sephardic Jew who sailed with Christopher Columbus at the beginning of the European colonization of the Americas. It is situated on East Sunrise Highway, between the Lutheran Church and the Roman Catholic "Mary Star of the Sea.". The synagogue functioned from 1972 to 2021 when it shut down because many members (mostly non nationals) left because of Covid.

References

Reform synagogues
Synagogues in the Bahamas
Buildings and structures in Freeport, Bahamas
Synagogues completed in 1972
Reform Judaism in North America